GPE may refer to:

Computing 
 Geopolitical entity, a geographical area which is associated with some sort of political structure, used in named-entity recognition
 GPE Palmtop Environment, a graphical user interface
 Google Play edition, a series of consumer mobile devices
 Google Plugin for Eclipse, a set of software development tools

Science 
 Gravitational potential energy
 External globus pallidus (GPe)
 Gross–Pitaevskii equation, in quantum physics
 GYPE, a protein

Other uses
 European Grand Prix for Choral Singing
 General Precision Equipment, a former American manufacturing company
 Ghanaian Pidgin English
 Global Partnership for Education
 Global Peace Exchange, at Florida State University
 Global political economy
 GP Express Airlines, an American airline
 Guadeloupe national football team
 General physical education; see adapted physical education